Nord-Elm is a federation of municipalities (Samtgemeinde) in Helmstedt, Lower Saxony. It is named after the Elm, on the northern edge of which it is located. Nord-Elm has an area of 63 km2 and a population of 6,200 (2003); its capital is Süpplingen. It was founded in 1969.

Member municipalities:
Frellstedt
Räbke
Süpplingen
Süpplingenburg
Warberg
Wolsdorf

See also
List of micro-regional organizations

Samtgemeinden in Lower Saxony